The All Japan Doubles or All Nippon Doubles was a professional golf tournament that was held in Japan from 1969 to 1973. A pairs event, it was founded by, and held at, Sapporo Kokusai Country Club in Kitahiroshima, Hokkaido and was an event on the Japan Golf Tour in its final year.

Winners
1973 Takashi Murakami and Hideyo Sugimoto
1972 Takashi Murakami and Masashi Ozaki
1971 Shigeru Uchida and Hiroshi Ishii
1970 Takashi Murakami and Hideyo Sugimoto
1969 Takashi Murakami and Hideyo Sugimoto

References

External links
Sapporo Kokusai C.C. site winners list 

Former Japan Golf Tour events
Defunct golf tournaments in Japan
Sport in Hokkaido
Recurring sporting events established in 1969
Recurring sporting events disestablished in 1973